Leo Colovini is an Italian designer of German-style board games born in Venice 1964. His most popular game is Cartagena. He is one of the few top board game designers who has owned a game store.

His life in games was strongly influenced by meeting Alex Randolph at the age of 12 with whom he worked on several of his games. He has also been part of studiogiochi, an Italian games company, and has also collaborated with Dario De Toffoli and has written books on games.

List of Games
Complete list of games that Colovini has created:

His games are known for their simplicity and drama as this quote from Board Game Geek illustrates:  "Carcasonne: The Discovery is also the simplest and most vanilla of the Carcassonnes. (Of course, if you know anything about Leo Colovini, you'd expect that.) But, it also the most tense Carcassonne. (And if you know Mr. Colovini, you also knew THAT!)"

References

External links 

Board game designers
Living people
Year of birth missing (living people)